Denis van Uffelen (born 5 July 1971) is a Belgian former professional tennis player.

Born in Brussels, van Uffelen competed on the professional tour in the 1990s and reached a career high singles world ranking of 264. His biggest achievement was winning the 1998 Bristol Challenger tournament, which he had entered into as a qualifier. He beat Adriano Ferreira in the final.

ATP Challenger titles

Singles: (1)

References

External links
 
 

1971 births
Living people
Belgian male tennis players
Sportspeople from Brussels